Cauê Vinicius dos Santos (born 16 November 2002), known simply as Cauê, is a Brazilian professional footballer who plays as a forward for Belgian club Lommel.

Club career 
Born in Novo Horizonte, São Paulo, Cauê started playing football in the local club Novorizontino. Cauê made his professional debut for Novorizontino on 21 March 2019 in the Campeonato Paulista.

He later signed for Corinthians. He became part-time with the professional squad in September 2020.

In January 2022, Cauê joined Belgian First Division B side Lommel on a five-year deal.

References

External links

2002 births
Footballers from São Paulo (state)
Living people
Brazilian footballers
Association football forwards
Grêmio Novorizontino players
Sport Club Corinthians Paulista players
Campeonato Brasileiro Série A players
Lommel S.K. players
Challenger Pro League players
Brazilian expatriate footballers
Expatriate footballers in Belgium
Brazilian expatriate sportspeople in Belgium
People from Ituverava
People from Novo Horizonte, São Paulo